Polypoetes semicoerulea is a moth of the family Notodontidae. It is found in Colombia.

This species is unusual for the genus Polypoetes in exhibiting uniformly black wings.

References

Moths described in 1910
Notodontidae of South America